The Beginning of the End is the second full-length studio album by the crossover thrash band, Sworn Enemy, released on Abacus Records in 2006. It was produced by Jamey Jasta of Hatebreed. There is a hidden track at the end of "Weight of the World".

Track listing

Personnel
 Sal Lococo - vocals
 Lorenzo Antonucci - guitar
 Jamin Hunt - bass guitar
 Paul Antignani - drums

Sworn Enemy albums
2006 albums